The Purbeck Group is an Upper Jurassic to Lower Cretaceous lithostratigraphic group (a sequence of rock strata) in south-east England. The name is derived from the district known as the Isle of Purbeck in Dorset where the strata are exposed in the cliffs west of Swanage.

The Purbeck Group is famous for its fossils of reptiles and early mammals. This sequence of rocks has gone by various names in the past including amongst others the Purbeck Beds, Purbeck Formation, Purbeck Limestone Formation and Purbeck Stone.

Rocks of this age have in the past been called the Purbeckian stage by European geologists. The Purbeckian corresponds with the Tithonian to Berriasian stages of the internationally used geologic timescale.

Outcrops 

The Purbeck Group outcrops follow the line of the Jurassic outcrop from Dorset, through the Vale of Wardour, Swindon, Garsington, Brill and Aylesbury. In East Sussex, the Purbeck Group outcrops at three locations north and northwest west of Battle, East Sussex and at Netherfield. They also occur at several other locations east of Heathfield, East Sussex and at Beak's Wood near Burwash. Deposits of evaporite minerals such as gypsum and anhydrite, within the Purbeck Group are mined and processed in Mountfield, East Sussex. In Lincolnshire they are represented in part by the Spilsby Sands and in Yorkshire by portions of the Speeton Clay.

Lithology and stratigraphy 
 
The rocks predominantly comprise calcareous mudstones though also include clays, shales and marls with marly, tuffaceous and shelly limestones, occasional oolitic and sandy strata, and evaporites. Nodules of chert are present in some of the limestones.

In most places the Purbeck Group rests conformably upon the Portland Group and it is conformably overlaid by the Wealden Group; but there are in some districts distinct indications that the Portland Group was uplifted and worn away to some extent prior to the deposition of the Purbeck Group.

Correlations 
In the past, many geologists have ranged the Purbeck Group with the overlying Lower Cretaceous Wealden Group on account of the similarity of its fresh-water faunas; but the marine fossils, including the fishes, ally the Purbeck more closely with the Upper Jurassic rocks of other parts, and it may be regarded as the equivalent of the upper Volgian of Russia. Contemporaneous rocks are also present in the neighbourhood of Boulogne-sur-Mer, where they are characterized by thin limestones with Cyrena and gypsiferous marls. These French outcrops occur, just like those in England, in the core of the Weald-Artois anticline. Purbeckian aged deposits occur even further south in the Charente. In north-west Germany three subdivisions are recognized in strata of the same age: in descending order Purbeck Kalk, Serpulit and Münder Mergel.

Subdivisions

Modern 
The Purbeck Group in Dorset is now divided into three formations, the Lulworth Formation and the overlying Durlston Formation in the south (in the Vectian or Wessex Basin). A third underlying formation, the Haddenham Formation, is identified in Wiltshire, Oxfordshire and Buckinghamshire. Within the Vectian Basin, the Durlston Formation is further divided into a lower 'Stair Hole Member' and an upper 'Peveril Point Member'. Similarly the Lulworth Formation is divided in Dorset into a lower 'Mupe Member', a middle 'Ridgeway Member' and an upper 'Worbarrow Tout Member'. In East Sussex the Purbeck Group is formally subdivided into the Blues and Greys Limestones members

Traditional 
The sequence was traditionally divided into three, though along different lines viz. Upper, Middle and Lower. The Upper Purbeck comprises . of fresh-water clays and shales with limestones, the Purbeck marble and Unio-bed, in the lower part. The Lower Purbeck consists of fresh-water and terrestrial deposits, marls, and limestones (the famous Portland limestone) with several fossil soils known as dirt beds. This division is very extensively exposed on the Isle of Portland, where many of the individual beds are known by distinctive names. The chief building stones of Upwey belong to this part of the Purbeck Group.

Fossil content 

No zonal fossil has been recognized for the British Purbeckian strata, but the horizon is approximately equivalent to that of Pensphinctes transilorius of the European continent. The Purbeckian equivalents of Spilsby and Speeton are in the zone of Belemnites lateralis. Other marine fossils are Hemicidaris purbeckensis and Ostrea distonta, the latter being abundant in the Cinder bed of the Middle Purbeck. The fresh-water mollusca include Viviparus (Paludina), Planorbis, Melanopsis, Unio, Cyrena. A large number of insect genera has been found in the Middle and Lower Purbeck Group.

Dinosaurs (Owenodon, Echinodon [known from "Isolated skull elements of at least [three] individuals."]), crocodylians (Goniopholis, Petrosuchus), Cimoliosaurus, the plesiosaurs and the chelonians (Chelone, Pleurosternum) are representative reptiles. The mammals, mostly determined from lower jaws, found in the beds mentioned above include Plagiaulax, Amblotherium, Stylodon, Dorsetodon, Triconodon, Spalacotherium and several others. The isopod crustacean Archaeoniscus brodiei is very common in the Purbeck of the Vale of Wardour.

Reptile remains diagnostic to the genus level (Megalosaurus sp (theropod indet), Opisthias) are among the fossils that have been recovered from the formation.

Fossil eggs referable to the oogenus Mycomorphoolithus are also known from the Purbeck Group.

The silicified stumps and trunks of cycads and coniferous trees, often surrounded by great masses of calcareous concretions (burrs), are very noticeable in the dirt beds of Portland and near Lulworth. Chara is found in the fresh-water cherts of the Middle Purbeck.

Use in construction 

The building stones of the Purbeck Group have already been mentioned; the Purbeck or Paludina "marble", a grey or greenish limestone full of shells, was formerly extensively employed in cathedrals and churches. Stone tiles or slats were once used locally for roofing from the Lower Purbeck of Portland, Swanage and Swindon. Gypsum was formerly worked from the Lower Purbeck at Swanage.

See also
 Geology of East Sussex
 List of dinosaur-bearing rock formations

References 

Geological groups of the United Kingdom
Geologic formations of England
Jurassic System of Europe
Lower Cretaceous Series of Europe
Cretaceous England
Jurassic England
Tithonian Stage
Berriasian Stage
Mudstone formations
Limestone formations
Marl formations
Shale formations
Ooliferous formations
Geology of Dorset